Anthony Thomas Kahoohanohano (July 22, 1930 – September 1, 1951) was an American soldier who was killed in action on September 1, 1951, during the Korean War. He became a recipient of the United States military's highest decoration for valor, the Medal of Honor.

Early life and family
A native of Maui, Hawaii, Kahoohanohano was the son of a police officer and one of seven siblings, 6 brothers and 1 sister. He lived in Wailuku and played football and basketball at St. Anthony's School for Boys (now known as St. Anthony High School) before graduating in 1949. All six of the Kahoohanohano brothers served in the U.S. military: Anthony and three others in the active duty Army, one in the Marine Corps, and one in the National Guard.

Korean War service

US Army

Distinguished Service Cross
By September 1, 1951, he was serving in Korea as a private first class with Company H, 2nd Battalion, 17th Infantry Regiment, 7th Infantry Division. On that day, near Chup'a-ri, he was in charge of a machine gun squad tasked with supporting another company. When a numerically superior enemy force launched an attack, he and his squad withdrew to a more defensible position. Although wounded in the shoulder, Kahoohanohano ordered his men to hold their ground while he gathered ammunition and returned to their original post. From that position, he single-handedly held off the enemy advance, fighting hand to hand with an entrenching tool after running out of ammunition, until he was killed. An American counter-attack later retook the position and found thirteen dead Chinese soldiers around Kahoohanohano's body. For these actions, he was posthumously awarded the U.S. Army's second-highest military decoration, the Distinguished Service Cross.

The medal was presented to his parents in 1952 on Maui.

Medal of Honor recommendation
In the late 1990s, Kahoohanohano's brother, Abel Kahoohanohano, Sr., began an effort to have the Distinguished Service Cross upgraded. Abel's son George took up the cause after his father's death. After an unsuccessful Medal of Honor nomination in 2001 by Representative Patsy Mink, which was rejected by the Army, the family enlisted the help of Senator Daniel Akaka. Akaka nominated Kahoohanohano for the medal again, and in March 2009 was informed by Secretary of the Army Pete Geren that, after "careful, personal consideration", the request had been approved. A provision making the upgrade official was included in the 2010 National Defense Authorization Act (H.R. 2647), signed into law by President Barack Obama on October 28, 2009.

The Medal of Honor was formally presented to the Kahoohanohano family at a White House ceremony on May 2, 2011.

Military decorations and awards
A complete list of Kahoohanohano's decorations include the Medal of Honor, Purple Heart, Combat Infantryman Badge, Korean Service Medal, United Nations Service Medal, National Defense Service Medal, Republic of Korea Presidential Unit Citation, and the Republic of Korea War Service Medal.

Distinguished Service Cross
Kahoohanohano's official Distinguished Service Cross citation reads:
The President of the United States of America, under the provisions of the Act of Congress approved July 9, 1918, takes pride in presenting the DISTINGUISHED SERVICE CROSS (Posthumously) to 

CITATION:

For extraordinary heroism in connection with military operations against an armed enemy of the United Nations while serving with Company H, 2d Battalion, 17th Infantry Regiment, 7th Infantry Division. Private First Class KAHOOHANOHANO distinguished himself by extraordinary heroism in action against enemy aggressor forces in the vicinity of Chup'a-ri, Korea, on 1 September 1951. On that date, Private KAHOOHANOHANO was in charge of a machine-gun squad supporting the defensive positions of Company F when a numerically superior enemy force launched a fierce attack. Because of the overwhelming numbers of the enemy, it was necessary for the friendly troops to execute a limited withdrawal. As the men fell back, he ordered his squad to take up more tenable positions and provide covering fire for the friendly force. Then, although painfully wounded in the shoulder during the initial enemy assault, he gathered a supply of grenades and ammunition and returned to his original position to face the enemy alone. As the hostile troops concentrated their strength against his emplacement in an effort to overrun it, Private KAHOOHANOHANO fought fiercely and courageously, delivering deadly accurate fire into the ranks of the onrushing enemy. When his ammunition was depleted, he engaged the enemy in hand-to-hand combat until he was killed. His heroic stand so inspired his comrades that they launched a counterattack that completely repulse the enemy. Coming upon Private KAHOOHANOHANO's position, the friendly troops found eleven enemy soldiers lying dead before it and two in the emplacement itself, beaten to death with an entrenching shovel.Kaho'ohanohano originally received the Distinguished Service Cross for his actions but on October 28, 2009, the Medal was upgraded to the Medal of Honor by President Barack Obama.

Medal of Honor
His Medal of Honor citation reads:

The President of the United States in the name of The Congress takes pride in presenting the MEDAL OF HONOR posthumously to

CITATION:
For conspicuous gallantry and intrepidity at the risk of his life above and beyond the call of duty: Private First Class Anthony T. KAHO'OHANOHANO, Company H, 17th Infantry Regiment, 7th Infantry Division, distinguished himself by acts of gallantry and intrepidity above the call of duty in action against the enemy in the vicinity of Chupa-ri, Korea, on 1 September 1951.  On that date, Private First Class KAHO'OHANOHANO was in charge of a machine-gun squad supporting the defensive positioning of Company F when a numerically superior enemy force launched a fierce attack.  Because of the enemy's overwhelming numbers, friendly troops were forced to execute a limited withdrawal.  As the men fell back, Private First Class KAHO'OHANOHANO ordered his squad to take up more defensible positions and provide covering fire for the withdrawing friendly force.  Although having been wounded in the shoulder during the initial enemy assault, Private First Class KAHO'OHANOHANO gathered a supply of grenades and ammunition and returned to his original position to face the enemy alone.  As the hostile troops concentrated their strength against his emplacement in an effort to overrun it, Private First Class KAHO'OHANOHANO fought fiercely and courageously, delivering deadly accurate fire into the ranks of the onrushing enemy.  When his ammunition was depleted, he engaged the enemy in hand-to-hand combat until he was killed.  Private First Class KAHO'OHANOHANO's heroic stand so inspired his comrades that they launched a counterattack that completely repulsed the enemy.  Upon reaching Private First Class KAHO'OHANOHANO's emplacement, friendly troops discovered 11 enemy soldiers lying dead in front of the emplacement and two inside it, killed in hand-to-hand combat.  Private First Class KAHO'OHANOHANO's extraordinary heroism and selfless devotion to duty are in keeping with the finest traditions of military service and reflect great credit upon himself, the 7th Infantry Division, and the United States Army.

See also

List of Korean War Medal of Honor recipients

Notes

References

External links
 
 Army news website – Soldiers inducted into Gallery of Heroes
 Maui news – MEDAL OF HONOR: Korean War vet ‘hero Maui can be proud of’
 Hawaii Army weekly
 Hawaiian Army Museum Society
 Maui News: MEDAL OF HONOR: Korean War vet 'hero Maui can be proud of
 Hawaii Senator news Release
 SPEECH OF HON. MAZIE K. HIRONO OF HAWAII IN THE HOUSE OF REPRESENTATIVES THURSDAY, NOVEMBER 5, 2009
 Congressional record
 Army Home Page standto archive from 2011/05/02/
 President to award posthumous Medals of Honor for Korea
 Medal of honor pfc Anthony T Kahoohanohano
 Korean war heroes to be posthumously awarded medal of honor today
 General Orders No. 2012–21 Award of the Medal of Honor to Private First Class Anthony T. Kahoʻohanohano
 PFC Anthony T. Kaho'ohanohano
 Chup’a-ri: A Forgotten Battle
 County of Maui – Resolution honoring Anthony T. Kaho'ohanohano as a Recipient of the Medal of Honor

1930 births
1951 deaths
People from Maui
United States Army soldiers
American military personnel killed in the Korean War
United States Army Medal of Honor recipients
Recipients of the Distinguished Service Cross (United States)
American military personnel of Native Hawaiian descent
Korean War recipients of the Medal of Honor
United States Army personnel of the Korean War